Kirk Kerkorian (June 6, 1917 – June 15, 2015) was an Armenian-American businessman, investor, and philanthropist. He was the president and CEO of Tracinda Corporation, his private holding company based in Beverly Hills, California. Kerkorian was one of the important figures in the shaping of Las Vegas and, with architect Martin Stern Jr., is described as the "father of the mega-resort". He built the world's largest hotel in Las Vegas three times: the International Hotel (opened in 1969), the MGM Grand Hotel (1973) and the MGM Grand (1993). He purchased the Metro-Goldwyn-Mayer movie studio in 1969.

Of Armenian descent, Kerkorian provided over $1 billion for charity in Armenia through his Lincy Foundation, which was established in 1989 and particularly focused on helping to rebuild northern Armenia after the 1988 earthquake. Kerkorian also provided money to ensure that a film based on the history of the Armenian genocide would be made. The resulting film, called The Promise, premiered in April 2017 in the United States. In 2000 Time magazine named him the 10th largest donor in the US. Kerkorian was declared an honorary citizen of Armenia. He was bestowed the title of National Hero of Armenia, the highest state award.

Early years
Kerkor Kerkorian was born on June 6, 1917 in Fresno, California, to Armenian parents who escaped present-day Turkey via cattle boat during the Armenian Genocide. Armenian was his first language and he "didn't learn the English language until he hit the streets." His family moved to Los Angeles following the depression of 1920–21. Dropping out of school in eighth grade, Kerkorian became a fairly skilled amateur boxer under the tutelage of his older brother Nish Kerkorian, fighting under the name "Rifle Right Kerkorian" to win the Pacific amateur welterweight championship. Kirk Kerkorian also had an older sister, Rose Kerkorian.

Business career

Aviation
Sensing the onset of World War II, and not wanting to join the infantry, Kerkorian learned to fly at the Happy Bottom Riding Club in the Mojave Desert—adjacent to the United States Army Air Corps's Muroc Field, now Edwards Air Force Base. In exchange for flying lessons from pioneer aviator Pancho Barnes, he agreed to milk and look after her cattle.

On gaining his commercial pilot's certificate in six months, Kerkorian learned that the British Royal Air Force was ferrying Canadian-built de Havilland Mosquitos over the North Atlantic to Scotland. Rather than take the safer Montreal–Labrador–Greenland–Iceland–Scotland route (although, going further north could mean the wings icing, and the plane crashing), Kerkorian preferred the direct "Iceland Wave" route, which blew the planes at jet-speed to Europe—but it wasn't constant, and could mean ditching. The fee was $1,000 per flight. Although accounts claim the risk was that one in four planes failed to make it, the actual rate was closer to one in forty. In May 1944, Kerkorian and his Wing Commander John de Lacy Wooldridge rode the wave and broke the old crossing record. Wooldridge got to Scotland in six hours, 46 minutes; Kerkorian, in seven hours, nine minutes. In two and a half years with RAF Ferry Command, Kerkorian delivered 33 planes, logged thousands of hours, traveled to four continents and flew his first four-engine plane.

After the war, having saved most of his wages, Kerkorian spent $5,000 on a Cessna. He worked as a general aviation pilot and made his first visit to Las Vegas in 1944. After spending much time in Las Vegas during the 1940s, Kerkorian quit gambling and in 1947 paid $60,000 for Trans International Airlines, which was a small air-charter service that flew gamblers from Los Angeles to Las Vegas. He then bid on some war surplus bombers, using money on loan from Seagram's. Gasoline, and especially airplane fuel, was in short supply at the time, so he sold the fuel from the planes' tanks, paid off his loan, and still had the airplanes. He operated the airline until 1968 when he sold it for $104 million to the Transamerica Corporation.

Las Vegas
In 1962, Kerkorian bought  in Las Vegas, across the Las Vegas Strip from the Flamingo, for $960,000. This purchase led to the building of Caesars Palace, which rented the land from Kerkorian; the rent and eventual sale of the land to Caesars in 1968 made Kerkorian $9 million ($70 million today).

In 1967, he bought  of land on Paradise Road in Las Vegas for $5 million and, with architect Martin Stern Jr., built the International Hotel, which at the time was the largest hotel in the world; The first two performers to appear at the hotel's enormous Showroom Internationale were Barbra Streisand and Elvis Presley. Presley brought in some 4,200 customers (and potential gamblers), every day, for 30 days straight, breaking in the process all attendance records in the county's history. Kerkorian's International Leisure also bought the Flamingo Hotel; eventually, both hotels were sold to the Hilton Hotels Corporation and were renamed the Las Vegas Hilton and the Flamingo Hilton, respectively.

After he purchased the Metro-Goldwyn-Mayer movie studio in 1969, Kerkorian (with architect Martin Stern Jr.) opened the original MGM Grand Hotel and Casino, larger than the Empire State Building and the largest hotel in the world at the time it was finished. On November 21, 1980, the original MGM Grand burned in a fire that was one of the worst disasters in Las Vegas history. The Clark County Fire Department reported 84 deaths in the fire; there were 87 deaths total, including three which occurred later as a result of injuries sustained in the fire. After only 8 months the MGM Grand reopened. Almost three months after the MGM fire, the Las Vegas Hilton caught fire, killing eight people.

In 1986, Kerkorian sold the MGM Grand hotels in Las Vegas and Reno for $594 million to Bally Manufacturing. The Las Vegas property was subsequently renamed Bally's. Spun off from Metro-Goldwyn-Mayer, MGM Resorts International owns and operates several properties, including the Bellagio, the current MGM Grand, The Mirage, the New York-New York, Circus Circus, Mandalay Bay, The Luxor, Excalibur, Park MGM and the CityCenter complex in Las Vegas.

MGM sold its Treasure Island Hotel and Casino property to billionaire and former New Frontier owner Phil Ruffin for $750 million.

MGM
In 1969, Kerkorian appointed James Thomas Aubrey Jr. as president of MGM. Aubrey downsized the struggling MGM and sold off massive amounts of historical memorabilia, including Dorothy's ruby slippers from the 1939 film The Wizard of Oz, the majority of the studio's backlots in Culver City and overseas operations such as the British MGM studio at Borehamwood. Kerkorian sold MGM's distribution system in 1973, and gradually distanced himself from the daily operation of the studio. He also owned minority interest in Columbia Pictures but his holdings were thwarted by the Justice Department who filed an antitrust suit due to his owning stock in two studios. In 1979, Kerkorian issued a statement claiming that MGM was now primarily a hotel company; however, he also managed to expand the overall film library and production system with the purchase of United Artists from Transamerica in 1981, becoming MGM/UA Entertainment Company. In March 1986, he sold MGM to Ted Turner. After the purchase was made, Turner sold the United Artists subsidiary back to Kerkorian.

Turner kept ownership of MGM from March 25 to August 26, 1986. He racked up huge debts and Turner simply could not afford to keep the studio under those circumstances. To recoup his investment, Turner sold the production/distribution assets and trademarks of MGM (including its post-May 1986 libraries) to United Artists, while retaining the pre-May 1986 MGM, Associated Artists Productions (the pre-1950 Warner Bros. library and Fleischer Studios/Famous Studios Popeye cartoons) and RKO Radio Pictures libraries as well as Gilligan's Island and its animated spin-offs The New Adventures of Gilligan and Gilligan's Planet. The studio lot was sold to Lorimar-Telepictures, which was later acquired by Warner Bros.; in 1990, the lot was sold to Sony Corporation's Columbia Pictures Entertainment in exchange for the half of Warner's lot that it had rented since 1972. Also in 1990, the MGM studio was purchased by Italian financier Giancarlo Parretti, who then merged the former Cannon with the MGM purchase to create the short-lived MGM-Pathé Communications. Parretti defaulted on the loans he'd used to buy the studio, leaving the studio in the hands of the French bank, Crédit Lyonnais. Crédit Lyonnais invested significant sums to revive the moribund studio and eventually sold it back to Kerkorian in 1996. Kerkorian soon expanded the company, purchasing Orion Pictures, The Samuel Goldwyn Company and Motion Picture Corporation of America from John Kluge's Metromedia in 1997, and bought the pre-1996 PolyGram Filmed Entertainment library in 1999 from its parent Philips, which was in process to sell PolyGram to Seagram.

In 2005, Kerkorian sold MGM once more to a consortium led by Sony. He retained a 55% stake in MGM Mirage.

On November 22, 2006, Kerkorian's Tracinda investment corporation offered to buy 15 million shares of MGM Mirage to increase his stake in the gambling giant from 56.3% to 61.7%, if approved.

In May 2009, following the completion of a $1 billion stock offering by MGM Mirage, Kerkorian and Tracinda lost their majority ownership of the gaming company, dropping from 53.8 percent to 39 percent and even after pledging to purchase 10 percent of the new stock offering they now remain minority owners.

Auto industry
Kerkorian had an on-again/off-again relationship with the American auto industry. His involvement began in 1995 when with the assistance of retired Chrysler chairman and CEO Lee Iacocca, Kerkorian staged a takeover attempt of the Chrysler Corporation. Chrysler's management treated the takeover as hostile, and after a lengthy battle, Kerkorian canceled his plans and sold his Chrysler stake in 1996. As part of the settlement, Iacocca was placed under a gag order forbidding him from discussing Chrysler in public or print for five years. Two years later, Chrysler management agreed to be acquired by German automaker Daimler-Benz. Kerkorian always drove an American vehicle, including a Ford Taurus and Jeep Cherokee.

Kerkorian once owned 9.9 percent of General Motors (GM). According to press accounts from June 30, 2006, Kerkorian suggested that Renault acquired a 20 percent stake in GM to rescue GM from itself. A letter from Tracinda to Rick Wagoner was released to the public, to pressure GM's executive hierarchy, but talks failed. On November 22, 2006 Kerkorian sold 14 million shares of his GM stake (it is speculated that this action was due to GM's rejection of Renault and Nissan's bids for stakes in the company as both of these bids were strongly supported by Kerkorian); the sale resulted in GM's share price falling 4.1% from its November 20 price, although it remained above $30/share. The sale lowered Kerkorian's holding to around 7% of GM. On November 30, 2006 Tracinda said it had agreed to sell another 14 million shares of GM, cutting Kerkorian's stake to half of what it had been earlier that year. By the end of November 2006, he had sold substantially all of his remaining GM shares. After Kerkorian sold, GM lost more than 90% of its value, falling as low as $1/share by May 2009, and filed bankruptcy on June 1, 2009.

On April 5, 2007, Kirk Kerkorian made a $4.58 billion bid for the Chrysler Group, the U.S. arm of Daimler-Chrysler. After Daimler-Chrysler announced they were interested in selling the Chrysler division on February 14, large investors such as Cerberus Capital Management, The Blackstone Group and Magna International each announced intentions to bid on the company. Kerkorian's bid, while not expected, was not surprising given his long involvement in the U.S. automobile industry. During the bidding process, he sought the aid of his close associate Jerome York who was a former CFO at both Chrysler and IBM. On May 14, 2007 80% of the Chrysler arm of Daimler-Chrysler was sold to Cerberus for $7.4 billion.

Kerkorian began buying Ford Motor Company stock in April 2008, and spent about $1 billion to accumulate a 6% stake in the automaker. By October 2008, the investment had lost two-thirds of its value, and he began selling. Tracinda explained, "In light of current economic and market conditions, it sees unique value in the gaming and hospitality and oil and gas industries and has, therefore, decided to reallocate its resources and to focus on those industries."

On October 21, Tracinda sold the 7.3 million Ford shares at an average price of $2.43, and said it planned to cut further its existing 6.1 percent stake in Ford, for a potential total loss of more than half a billion dollars. Kerkorian sold his remaining stake in Ford on December 29, 2008.

Wealth
Kerkorian's net worth in 2008 was $16.0 billion according to Forbes magazine, making him the 41st richest person in the world and the richest person in California at that time. By 2011, Kerkorian was among those hardest hit by stock market recession as his net worth tumbled to $3.2 billion. In 2013 he was listed as the 412th richest person with a net worth of $3.9 billion.

Personal life
Kerkorian was an "intensely private person". He almost never gave interviews and seldom appeared in public. "Kerkorian rarely attended board meetings and never gave speeches. He was shy, but was a tough negotiator. Those who knew him describe him not as a Hughesian hermit, but as a gentle, gracious, normal guy."

Kerkorian was an avid tennis player, played in tournaments, associated with other players like Lornie Kuhle, and routinely played with Alex Yemenidjian, a former MGM executive, and former owner of the Tropicana Las Vegas resort. He had a penchant for expensive clothes (especially custom-made outfits by Italian designer Brioni), but drove relatively low cost vehicles, such as a Pontiac Firebird, Jeep Grand Cherokee and a Ford Taurus.

Kerkorian died in Beverly Hills, California on June 15, 2015, nine days after his 98th birthday. He is buried at Inglewood Park Cemetery in Inglewood, California near Los Angeles.

Family

Kerkorian was married four times, first to Hilda Schmidt from 1942 to 1952. His next marriage, to Jean Maree Hardy, lasted from 1954 to 1984. The two had met at the Thunderbird resort in Las Vegas. Hardy, a dancer from England, traveled the world instructing dance troupes. They met and fell in love while she was sent to check opportunities to choreograph a performance in Las Vegas. The marriage produced Kerkorian's two daughters, Tracy and Linda, whose names serve as a portmanteau for Kerkorian's personal holding company, Tracinda Corporation, and his charitable organisation, the Lincy Foundation. Although divorced, they remained close friends and confidants.

Kerkorian's short-lived third marriage (1999) was to professional tennis player Lisa Bonder, 48 years his junior, which lasted only one month. The two had signed a prenuptial agreement before marrying. Kerkorian subsequently was involved in a breach of privacy suit filed against him by Steve Bing. Kerkorian claimed Bing was the father of Bonder's daughter, an allegation which was later confirmed by DNA paternity testing. On August 10, 2006, the Los Angeles Times reported that Kerkorian's attorneys were being sued by Bonder because of their connection to former high-profile private investigator Anthony Pellicano, who in 2008 began serving a fifteen-year prison sentence for running a wiretapping scheme. Bonder's attorney alleged that Kerkorian's lawyers hired Pellicano to wiretap telephone calls between him and Kerkorian's ex-wife in order to gain a tactical advantage in the divorce proceedings, an allegation that was later proven true. Pellicano also took a strand of Bing's used dental floss (surreptitiously acquired from rubbish) and used it to prove that it was Bing and not Kerkorian who fathered Bonder's daughter. Attorney Terry Christensen was subsequently convicted of racketeering for hiring Pellicano to tap Bonder's phone, and received a three-year prison sentence that was confirmed on appeal.

Kerkorian's short-lived fourth marriage (2014) was to Una Davis, born in 1966. The marriage lasted only 57 days and divorce proceedings were underway when Kerkorian died in June 2015.

The Lincy Foundation and philanthropic activities

Kerkorian was active in philanthropy through his charitable foundation, The Lincy Foundation, named after his daughters, Linda and Tracy. The foundation reportedly donated more than $1 billion, though Kerkorian never allowed anything to be named in his honor. The foundation covered half of the cost of an 80-kilometer highway in Armenia. Over the next decade, Kerkorian financed more than $200 million of infrastructure projects in Armenia, including $60 million to the reconstruction of schools and streets and the renovation of many museums, theaters and concert halls.

The Lincy Foundation was dissolved in 2011 after 22 years of charitable activities after dispensing its last $200 million to University of California, Los Angeles. Half was earmarked for medical research, scholarships and other projects while the other half was earmarked to create the "Dream Fund" for charitable causes around the country.

Estate 
Most of the $2 billion estate was left to charity, with a three-person committee left to distribute the funds within three years. In December 2018 the estate settled with his 4th wife for $12.5 million, along with $10.0 million and $50.0 million for two philanthropic foundations, advised by his 4th wife.

Awards and recognition
Armenia issued a Kirk Kerkorian stamp in 2017. The city of Gyumri unveiled a statue of Kerkorian in 2018.

References

Bibliography

Further reading
 
 Making it in America: A Sourcebook on Eminent Ethnic Americans 2001
 More Peoples of Las Vegas: One City, Many Faces 2010
 The Rough Guide to Las Vegas 2011
 Philanthropists and Foundation Globalization 2011
 
 
 Kirk Kerkorian article, includes MGM fire information
 Kirk Kerkorian article at Armeniapedia.org
 2006 Nov 30 Kerkorian GM stock sale

External links 
 

1917 births
2015 deaths
20th-century American businesspeople
20th-century American philanthropists
American billionaires
Armenian billionaires
American male boxers
American casino industry businesspeople
American chief executives of financial services companies
American film studio executives
American financiers
American hoteliers
American investors
American people of Armenian descent
American transportation businesspeople
American venture capitalists
Burials at Inglewood Park Cemetery
Businesspeople from California
Corporate raiders
Metro-Goldwyn-Mayer executives
National Hero of Armenia
People from Beverly Hills, California
People from Fresno, California
Automotive businesspeople